Goin' South is a 1978 American Western-comedy film, directed by and starring Jack Nicholson, with Mary Steenburgen, Christopher Lloyd, John Belushi, Richard Bradford, Veronica Cartwright, Danny DeVito and Ed Begley Jr.

Plot
Henry Lloyd Moon (Nicholson) is a third-rate outlaw in the late 1860s; a convicted bank robber, horse thief and cattle thief. He is sentenced to be hanged in Longhorn, Texas, to the glee of the locals who gather to watch his execution. A local ordinance dictates that a man condemned of any crime other than murder may be freed, if a lady will marry him and take responsibility for his good behavior. Well aware of the ordinance, many of the townswomen scrutinize Moon as he mounts the gallows.

An elderly woman offers to marry him, but dies on the spot immediately. As Moon is dragged back to the gallows, Julia Tate (Steenburgen)—a headstrong, genteel Southern virgin—agrees to marry and take charge of him. She weds Moon, intending only to use him as labor in a secret gold mine under her property. This slowly evolves into a shaky partnership as he gains her trust, then develops into much more. Her chastity and his desire to consummate the marriage become a source of friction. Although they do spend the night together in a cave, she regrets her decision the following morning, and in anger, Moon ties her to the bed and, it is implied, sexually assaults her. He tries to flee town but is brought back by the sheriff's men where he and Julia patch things up, realizing they need each other.

The local sheriff's deputy (Lloyd) repeatedly accuses Moon of stealing "his" girl, although there is no evidence that Julia ever had any interest in the deputy, and it was she who offered marriage to Moon. Moon's old gang complicates matters when they arrive at Julia's home and introduce the teetotalling Julia to intoxicating beverages. They discover that Julia and Moon are mining gold. Moon schemes to betray Julia and steal the gold but a cave-in at the mine changes the nature of their relationship.

Cast
 Jack Nicholson – Henry Lloyd Moon
 Mary Steenburgen – Julia Tate Moon
 Christopher Lloyd – Deputy Towfield
 John Belushi – Deputy Hector
 Richard Bradford – Sheriff Kyle
 Gerald H. Reynolds – Polty
 Veronica Cartwright – Hermine
 Jeff Morris – Big Abe
 Danny DeVito – Hog
 Tracey Walter – Coogan
 Britt Leach – Parson Weems
 Luana Anders – Loretta Anderson
 George W. Smith — Mr. Anderson
 Lucy Lee Flippin – Diane Haber
 Ed Begley Jr. – Whitey Haber
 Lin Shaye – Parasol Lady
 Anne Ramsey – Spinster #2

Production
The film was co-written by John Herman Shaner and produced by Harry Gittes, both longtime friends of Jack Nicholson from his early days in Hollywood.

It is the film debut of Mary Steenburgen, who had been a waitress in New York hoping to break into acting and after being turned down repeatedly for film roles; it launched her career in Hollywood. Christopher Lloyd, who worked with Nicholson on One Flew Over the Cuckoo's Nest, plays Deputy Towfield. Lloyd and Steenburgen reunited 12 years later as love interests in another western-comedy, Robert Zemeckis' Back to the Future Part III.

This was John Belushi's second film after having been a Saturday Night Live cast member for several years. This film was shot and released after National Lampoon's Animal House in July 1978.

It was the second of three films directed by Nicholson, the first was 1971's Drive, He Said and the third was the Chinatown sequel The Two Jakes, released in 1990. This marks the first film in which Nicholson appears as the primary actor while directing. He does not appear in Drive, He Said, but did star in and direct The Two Jakes.

The credits state that the film was shot in Durango, Mexico.

Reception
It was not a hit upon release in 1978 with critics or audiences. On Rotten Tomatoes, it has an 73% approval rating based on 15 reviews, with an average rating of 6.6/10. On Metacritic, it holds a 52 score based on 9 reviews, indicating "mixed or average reviews".

Variety wrote, "Jack Nicholson playing Gabby Hayes is interesting, even amusing at times, but Hayes was never a leading man, which 'Goin' South' desperately needs," adding that the "largely uninteresting" relationship between the Nicholson and Steenburgen characters "never jells, as Nicholson continues to sputter and chomp, acting more like her grandfather than a handsome roué out to overcome her virginity." Gene Siskel of the Chicago Tribune gave the film two-and-a-half stars out of four and stated that "Jack Nicholson may be cute, but two hours of cute he is not ... Nicholson as director takes his own sweet time, giving us scene after scene of him acting silly. My guess is that he doesn't think he is being indulgent with the character, because half the time he puts the character down. But the result is the same: Jack and more Jack. The film could use more of John Belushi, the 'Animal House' star, wasted here in a walk-on as a fat Mexican deputy sheriff. What 'Goin' South' could also use is a credible villain." Charles Champlin of the Los Angeles Times was positive, writing, "There ain't much to it, to drop into the cackling vernacular of the movie, but what there is, is choice. Nicholson, directing for the first time since 'Drive, He Said,' has a fine way with actors, including himself, and he sets and sustains a tone that is larger than life but not so broad as to be only farcically foolish." Gary Arnold of The Washington Post called the film "a stupefying throwback" that "expires right before your eyes from a terminal case of the feebles," with Nicholson and Steenburgen "a bust" as a romantic comedy team. David Ansen of Newsweek wrote, "Droll, sweet-tempered and lackadaisical, it's a shaggy-dog story with Nicholson playing the shaggy dog ... Unfortunately, after a highly inventive first half, the tale gets mighty thin, and the waifish Steenburgen doesn't have enough range to carry her share of the romantic burden. Just when 'Goin' South' needs to build, the pace gets poky and the wit becomes mere whimsy. A little less coyness, and a lot more John Belushi (as a Mexican deputy), would have helped." Lawrence O'Toole wrote in Maclean's, "Every time Nicholson beams his gin-soaked grin into the movie, Goin' South is momentarily salvaged; but everything and everybody outside him seem to atrophy in the sun. It's his second crack at directing ... and he's not untalented, yet the selection of shots doesn't have the rhythmic grace to pull us into the wispy narrative." Pauline Kael of The New Yorker stated, "Nicholson's prankish performance dominates the movie, and, with his prankishness also coming out in the casting and the directing, the movie hasn't any stabilizing force; there's nothing to balance what he's doing—no one with a stratjacket."

Mary Steenburgen earned a nomination for the Golden Globe Award for New Star of the Year – Actress.

References

External links
 
 

1978 films
1970s Western (genre) comedy films
American Western (genre) comedy films
Films directed by Jack Nicholson
Paramount Pictures films
Films with screenplays by Charles Shyer
Films scored by Perry Botkin Jr.
Films scored by Van Dyke Parks
Films set in Texas
Films shot in Mexico
1978 comedy films
1970s English-language films
1970s American films